Wujin District (postal: Wutsin) is a district under the jurisdiction of Changzhou in Jiangsu province of the People's Republic of China. In 2005 Wujin was ranked as 8th in the top 100 best cities and counties in mainland China.

History
In 2005 the total population was recorded at 951,000 people, a decline from the 1.2m inhabitants recorded in 1999. In 2005 Wujin was ranked as 8th in the top 100 best cities and counties in mainland China. On May 7, 2015, Qishuyan District became a part of Wujin District.

Administrative divisions
In the present, Wujin District has 5 subdistricts and 14 towns.
5 subdistricts
 Nanxiashu
 Xihu
-Former Qishuyan District has 3 subdistricts.
 Qishuyan
 Dingyan
 Lucheng

14 towns

Dialect
The local language is the Changzhou dialect of Wu Chinese.

Tourism
The district is most famous for the Chunqiu Yancheng, the remains of an ancient city from the Spring and Autumn period.

Education
The Wycombe Abbey International School of Changzhou (formerly Oxford International College of Changzhou) is located in Wujin District, serving Chinese and foreign students for kindergarten through high school.

References

External links

Official site of the Wujin district government (Chinese)

 
County-level divisions of Jiangsu
Changzhou